The 2006–07 NCAA Division III men's ice hockey season began on October 15, 2006 and concluded on March 18 of the following year. This was the 34th season of Division III college ice hockey.

Regular season

Season tournaments

Standings

Note: Mini-game are not included in final standings

2007 NCAA Tournament

Note: * denotes overtime period(s)

See also
 2006–07 NCAA Division I men's ice hockey season

References

External links

 
NCAA